The South Port Surf Lifesaving Club was established 1959 in the coastal Adelaide suburb of Port Noarlunga, South Australia. The South Port Clubhouse is situated in the sand dunes at the mouth of the Onkaparinga River Estuary. Due to its location at the mouth of a major South Australian river and its position in Gulf St Vincent, South Port is a renowned surfing beach for both board riders and body surfers.

History

The club's beginning 

In 1958, following a meeting on the beach after a carnival between officials of Surf Life Saving and Geoff Price, Frank Harris and Geoff Cornwell, approval was given to form a Surf Life Saving Club at South Port. Before this, members from Port Noarlunga S.L.S.C. had needed to run down to South Port with the gear to perform the rescues, and in cases where first aid was needed carry a stretcher up the cliffs. There was an obvious need for a rescue facility at South Port as this was the area where the most rescues occurred. Many of the members of Port Noarlunga also spent much of their spare time at South Port surfing or body surfing and it was a very popular beach for the growing sport of surfing.

At this time there was also a dispute between the above members and the Port Noarlunga Club at this time due to a minor disciplinary matter and consequently the desire to set up a new club was due to both personal and life-saving reasons. The Port Noarlunga Club argued against the formation of the new club and accused the breakaway group of being "rats deserting a sinking ship". Geoff Cornwell argued the case for the formation of the club and the Surf Life Saving Association, under the presidency of Don Newlands, approved the new club. The original name of the club was South Port Noarlunga but the Noarlunga was dropped as part of the name.

The South Port Club came into being when seven members of the Port Noarlunga Club applied for permission to form a club to patrol the beach in the vicinity of the mouth of the Onkaparinga River. "Good luck chaps and congratulations on your initiative"

S.L.S.A. of S.A. 7th Annual Report

The fledgling club began patrols in season 1958/1959 from February onwards with the following members who are named on the first registration form that was lodged at SA State Centre on 22 December 1958:-

The original club colours were to be navy blue and white but Henley Beach complained and the colours were registered in 1958 as navy blue, white, and red. These colours were subsequently changed in that first season to the current navy white, and green.

In those first two seasons with such a small membership it became very difficult to maintain the patrols and set up a new club and clubhouse, so new members were needed to ensure the permanent establishment of the South Port Club. In season 1960/1961 Don Alexander and Graham Ellery who were discontented at Glenelg S.L.S.C. joined the South Port Club and this new injection of experienced senior members enable the South Port Club to become firmly established and start to grow. The ten members involved in the permanent establishment of the South Port Surf Life Saving Club are the foundation members of the club and all members past, present and future are greatly indebted to their foresight and hard work.

In 1960/61, a clubhouse was purchased for $194 and erected on a section of land that in 1958/1959 had been leased from the department lands and the Port Noarlunga District Council.

Training
Surf lifesavers must be competent swimmers as well as experience in rescue, resuscitation and first aid. This experience is gained in a minimum of 20 hours of training and followed by a written and practical examination. Volunteers must be at least 15 years old for their initial training and at 16 years of age volunteers are encouraged to become proficient in oxygen administration. Upon completion, members are awarded the Nationally Accredited Certificate 2 in Public Safety (Aquatic Rescue) Bronze Medallion and become qualified to patrol a beach. Yearly proficiency must be shown to maintain their ability to patrol.

South Port also has junior members, or Nippers as they are more commonly known. Nippers are aged between 5–13 years and learn beach safety and awareness skills, in a fun and healthy environment.

See also

Surf lifesaving
Surf Life Saving Australia
List of Australian surf lifesaving clubs

References

External links
 
Surf Life Saving South Australia
Surf Life Saving Australia
Beachsafe beach safety website operated by SLSA
The SLSA Academy
SLSA's surf shop
SLSA's Facebook page

1958 establishments in Australia
Sports clubs established in 1958
Surf Life Saving Australia clubs
Sporting clubs in Adelaide